Nippoleucon is a genus of hooded shrimps within the family Leuconidae, with 3 species currently assigned to the genus.

Species 

 Nippoleucon enoshimensis 
 Nippoleucon hinumensis 
 Nippoleucon projectus

References 

Cumacea
Malacostraca genera